Gus Powell (1974) is an American street photographer. He was a member of the In-Public street photography collective.

Powell has published two of his own photography books: The Company of Strangers (2003) and The Lonely Ones (2015), the latter with work spanning a decade. He has had a solo exhibition at Museum of the City of New York and his work is held in the permanent collections of the Art Institute of Chicago, Museum of Fine Arts Houston, and Foam Fotografiemuseum Amsterdam. In 2003 Photo District News considered Powell one of their 30 emerging photographers to watch, and in 2013 he won an award in the National Magazine Awards.

Life and work
Powell was born in New York City in 1974. He became a member of the In-Public street photography collective in 2003.

His photographs are regularly published in The New Yorker.

Publications

Publications by Powell
The Company of Strangers. Atlanta and New York: J&L, 2003.
The Lonely Ones. Atlanta and New York: J&L, 2015.
Family Car Trouble. TBW, 2019. . Edition of 940 copies.

Publications with contributions by Powell
Bystander: A History of Street Photography. Second edition. Boston: Bulfinch, 2001. By Joel Meyerowitz and Colin Westerbeck. . Paperback.
Revised and expanded edition. London: Laurence King, 2017. . Hardback.
Here is New York: A Democracy of Photographs. Scalo, 2002. . Includes seven photographs by Powell.
A Field Guide To The North American Family. New York City: Mark Batty, 2007. By Garth Risk Hallberg. .
10 – 10 Years of In-Public. London: Nick Turpin, 2010. . Includes an essay by Jonathan Glancey, "Outlandish Harmony"; a foreword by Nick Turpin; and a chapter each by Powell and others.
Street Photography Now. London: Thames & Hudson, 2010.  (hardback). London: Thames & Hudson, 2011.  (paperback). Edited by Sophie Howarth and Stephen McLaren.
The Street Photographer's Manual. London: Thames & Hudson, 2014. . By David Gibson.

Awards
2003: One of Photo District News's "PDN 30 2003," one of 30 emerging photographers to watch
2013: Feature Photography category, National Magazine Awards, New York. One of a few winners, for photography in New York magazine

Solo exhibitions

Manhattan Noon, Museum of the City of New York, New York, December 2007 – April 2008.
The Lonely Ones, Galerie Ghezelbash & Motte Masselink, Paris, France, November, 2015; Sasha Wolf Gallery, New York, January, 2016; Micamera, Milan, Italy, April, 2016.
Bloomberg Philanthropies Public Art Project, Spartanburg Art Museum, Spartanburg, South Carolina, March 2018 - May 2018.

Collections
Powell's work is held in the following permanent collections:
Art Institute of Chicago: 1 print
Museum of Fine Arts Houston: 1 print

Foam Fotografiemuseum Amsterdam

Film
In-Sight (2011). 38 minute documentary directed and edited by Nick Turpin, commissioned by Format for the Format International Photography Festival, Derby, 2011. Includes interviews with Powell and others, and shows him at work.

Notes

References

External links

Powell's profile at In-Public

1974 births
Living people
Street photographers
Photographers from New York City